Tor Torkildsen (June 3, 1932, Trondheim – July 8, 2006) was a Norwegian seaman and ship-owner who changed career to novelist in his 60s.

The family shipping company Torkildsen went bankrupt in 1977, and he took up writing while residing in Scotland, later returning to Trondheim. In the 1980s he was a copywriter for Stentofon, but the company went under and Torkildsen turned to writing full-time. After writing several scripts in English, he was rejected by several British publishing houses. Translating one script to Norwegian, he was picked as a writer up by Aschehoug after taking part in a thriller book contest, despite not winning the contest.

His debut thriller novel, Stella Baltica, was published in 1994, followed by Dødt skip in 1995 and På død manns kiste in 1996. In 1995 he also debuted as a young adult fiction writer, releasing Piratene på Bali followed by Gullskatten på revet (1996). The thrillers were issued by Aschehoug and the young adult fiction books by Cappelen. Torkildsen was then contracted to Bladkompaniet to write the pocket book series Brenning. The first 18 Brenning books were printed in a circulation of 200,000.

References

1932 births
2006 deaths
People from Trondheim
Norwegian businesspeople in shipping
20th-century Norwegian novelists
21st-century Norwegian novelists
Norwegian thriller writers